Prelude is the third Korean extended play by South Korean girl group April. It was released on January 4, 2017 by DSP Media and distributed by LOEN Entertainment. It marks the group's first comeback as a six member-group with the addition of Chaekyung and Rachel.

Background and release
On December 20, 2016, DSP Media confirmed that April would release their third extended play, Prelude on January 4, 2017. The title of the album Prelude represent the group's new beginning, with their new line-up consisting of Chaekyung, Chaewon, Naeun, Yena, Rachel and Jinsol. The next day, the album's tracklist was released, revealing that the album will includes 9 tracks with 5 new songs, a re-recorded version of 3 of their previous tracks: "Dream Candy", "Muah!" and "Snowman", and an instrumental version of the title track.

On December 27, they revealed two concept images of the group were unveiled, the first follows the "cute and innocent" image of the group and the second showing a still "innocent" but more mature side. On December 28, April released a teaser with member Rachel for showing the choreography key point dance moves and also revealed that the title track of the album, "April Story".

On December 30, their music video making teasers for Jinsol, Chaekyung and Rachel were revealed, followed by Naeun, Chaewon and Yena's on December 31. On January 1, 2017, the highlight medley of the five new songs from the mini-album was released.

Promotions
From January 1 to January 3, Chaekyung, Chaewon, Naeun, Yena, Rachel and Jinsol held a series of live appearances on their Naver's V-app channel. On January 3, the music video for "April Story" was released on the group's YouTube channel.

On January 4, the group also held a live aired comeback showcase for Prelude, on Naver's V-app. On January 6, April had their comeback stage on KBS's Music Bank that were eventually followed by appearances on Mnet's M Countdown, MBC's Show! Music Core and SBS's Inkigayo.

On January 19, the Special choreography MV of "April Story" was released.

On February 14, 2017, Chaekyung, Chaewon, Naeun, Yena, Rachel and Jinsol performed a special stage of Apink's "LUV" for the 100th episode of SBS MTV The Show. Starting from February 16, the group performed, on Mnet's, M! Countdown, a series of special stages of "WOW" a song also figuring on the Prelude album.

Track listing

Release history

References

2017 EPs
Korean-language EPs
Kakao M EPs
April (girl group) albums
DSP Media albums